Charles Sampson Hartman (March 1, 1861 – August 3, 1929) was a U.S. Representative from Montana.

Born in Monticello, Indiana, Hartman attended the public schools and Wabash College in Crawfordsville.
He moved to Bozeman, Montana, in January 1882.
He studied law and was admitted to the bar in 1884, and began practicing in Bozeman. He was a probate judge of Gallatin County 1884–1886.
He served as member of the State constitutional convention in 1889.

Hartman was elected as a Republican to the Fifty-third and Fifty-fourth Congresses.
He was reelected as a Silver Republican to the Fifty-fifth Congress and served from March 4, 1893 to March 3, 1899.
He declined to be a candidate for renomination in 1898.
He served as delegate to the 1896 Republican National Convention.
He resumed the practice of law.

He became affiliated with the Democratic Party in 1900.
He served as delegate to the 1900 Democratic National Convention.
He was an unsuccessful candidate for election as a Democrat in 1910 to the Sixty-second Congress.
He was appointed Envoy Extraordinary and Minister Plenipotentiary to Ecuador in July 1913 and served until May 14, 1922, when he returned to Bozeman.
He moved to Great Falls in 1926 and resumed the practice of law.
He moved to Fort Benton in 1927, having been appointed judge of the twelfth judicial district of Montana on March 3, 1927.

Hartman was elected to the same office in 1928, and served until his death in Great Falls, on August 3, 1929. He was interred in Riverside Cemetery in Fort Benton.

References

1861 births
1929 deaths
People from Monticello, Indiana
Republican Party members of the United States House of Representatives from Montana
Silver Republican Party members of the United States House of Representatives from Montana
Montana Democrats
Ambassadors of the United States to Ecuador
Montana state court judges
Politicians from Great Falls, Montana
Politicians from Bozeman, Montana
People from Fort Benton, Montana
Wabash College alumni